The 59th Filipino Academy of Movie Arts and Sciences Awards Night was held on December 10, 2011 at Tanghalang Leandro Locsin, National Commission for Culture and the Arts, Intramuros, Manila.

Ang Tanging Ina Mo (Last na 'To!), produced by  Malou Santos and Charo Santos-Concio, is the recipient of this edition's FAMAS Award for Best Picture.

Awards

Major Awards
Winners are listed first and highlighted with boldface.

{| class=wikitable
|-
! style="background:#EEDD82; width:50%" | Best Picture
! style="background:#EEDD82; width:50%" | Best Director
|-
| valign="top" |
 Ang Tanging Ina Mo (Last na 'To!) — Charo Santos-Concio, Malou Santos 
 Sa 'yo Lamang — Charo Santos-Concio, Malou Santos
 Dalaw — Charo Santos-Concio, Malou Santos, Kris Aquino
 Rosario — Albert Martinez, Ernesto 'Bong' Sta. Maria Jr.
 Miss You like Crazy — Charo Santos-Concio, Malou Santos
 Sigwa — Pelita Peralta-Uy, Stanley T. Uy
| valign="top" |
 Albert Martinez — Rosario
 Rodel Nacianceno, Dondon S. Santos — Noy
 Cathy Garcia-Molina — Miss You like Crazy
 Wenn V. Deramas — Ang Tanging Ina Mo (Last na 'To!)
 Laurice Guillen — Sa 'yo Lamang 
|-
! style="background:#EEDD82; width:50%" | Best Actor
! style="background:#EEDD82; width:50%" | Best Actress
|-
| valign="top" |
 John Lloyd Cruz — Miss You like Crazy
 Dennis Trillo — Rosario
 Ramon 'Bong' Revilla Jr. — Si Agimat at si Enteng Kabisote
 Tirso Cruz III — Sigwa
 Vic Sotto — Si Agimat at si Enteng Kabisote
 Coco Martin — Noy
| valign="top" |
 Ai-Ai de las Alas — Ang Tanging Ina Mo (Last na 'To!)
 Dawn Zulueta — Sigwa
 Bea Alonzo — Miss You like Crazy
 Lorna Tolentino — Sa 'yo Lamang
 Jennylyn Mercado — Rosario
|-
! style="background:#EEDD82; width:50%" | Best Supporting Actor
! style="background:#EEDD82; width:50%" | Best Supporting Actress
|-
| valign="top" |
 Allen Dizon — Sigwa
 Baron Geisler — Noy
 Carlo Aquino — Ang Tanging Ina Mo (Last na 'To!)
 Sid Lucero — Rosario
 Jaime Fabregas — Here Comes the Bride
| valign="top" |
 Eugene Domingo — Here Comes the Bride
 Zsa Zsa Padilla — Sigwa
 Eugene Domingo — Ang Tanging Ina Mo (Last na 'To!)
 Gina Pareño — Dalaw
 Shaina Magdayao — Sa 'yo Lamang
|-
! style="background:#EEDD82; width:50%" | Best Child Actor
! style="background:#EEDD82; width:50%" | Best Child Actress
|-
| valign="top" |
 Maliksi Morales — Dalaw
 Timothy Chan — Here Comes the Bride
| valign="top" |
 Xyriel Manabat — Ang Tanging Ina Mo (Last na 'To!)
 Cheska Billiones — Noy
 Dessa Rizalina Fernandez Ilagan — Sigwa
 Jillian Ward — Si Agimat at si Enteng Kabisote
|- 
! style="background:#EEDD82; width:50%" | Best Screenplay
! style="background:#EEDD82; width:50%" | Best Cinematography
|-
| valign="top" |
 Bonifacio Ilagan — Sigwa
 Juan Miguel Sevilla, Vanessa R. Valdez, Tey Clamor — Miss You like Crazy
 Mel Mendoza-Del Rosario — Ang Tanging Ina Mo (Last na 'To!)
 Elmer L. Gatchalian — Rosario
 Ralph Jacinto Quiblat, Ricardo Lee, Karen Ramos — Sa 'yo Lamang
| valign="top" |
 Carlo Mendoza — Rosario
 Timmy Jimenez — Noy
 Lee Meily — Sa 'yo Lamang
 Monino Duque — Sigwa
 Manuel Teehankee — Miss You like Crazy
  Anne Monzon — Dalaw
|-
! style="background:#EEDD82; width:50%" | Best Art Direction
! style="background:#EEDD82; width:50%" | Best Sound
|-
| valign="top" |
 Joey Luna — Rosario
 Jesse Bueno, Ruben Arthur Nicdao — Si Agimat at si Enteng Kabisote
 Glen Herbert Adriano — Noy
 Raymond Bajarias — Dalaw
 Edgar Martin Littaua — Sigwa
| valign="top" |
 Addiss Tabong, Albert Michael Idioma — Si Agimat at si Enteng Kabisote
 Ross Diaz — Noy
 Richard Hocks, Warren Santiago — Rosario
 Albert Michael Idioma — Dalaw
 Alfredo Ongleo — Sigwa
|-
! style="background:#EEDD82; width:50%" | Best Editing
! style="background:#EEDD82; width:50%" | Best Special Effects
|-
| valign="top" |
 Marya Ignacio — Miss You like Crazy
 Renewin Alano — Dalaw
 Marya Ignacio — My Amnesia Girl
 Chrisel Galeno-Desuasido — Si Agimat at si Enteng Kabisote
 John Anthony L. Wong — Rosario
 Efren Jarlego — Sa 'yo Lamang
| valign="top" |
 Dekdek Torrente, Erick Torrente — Si Agimat at si Enteng Kabisote
 Chie Torrente, Benny Batoctoy — Dalaw
 Dekdek Torrente, Erick Torrente — Rosario
 Sa 'yo Lamang
 Noy 
|-
! style="background:#EEDD82; width:50%" | Best Visual Effects
! style="background:#EEDD82; width:50%" | Best Story
|-
| valign="top" |
  Kim Erik Samson, Melvyn M. Quimosing, Jay Santiago — Si Agimat at si Enteng Kabisote
 Tessa Cam Rowe, Relie Hinojosa — Rosario
 Marites Mendoza, Aldo Aguilar — Noy
 Earl Bontuyan, Dodge Ledesma — Dalaw 
 Elmer Buencamino, Arturo Jarlego — Sa 'yo Lamang
| valign="top" |
 Joel Lamangan, Bonifacio Ilagan — Sigwa
 Karen Ramos, Ricardo Lee, Ralph Jacinto Quiblat, John Paul Abellera, Mia Louise C. Ramos — Sa 'yo Lamang
 Mel Mendoza-Del Rosario — Ang Tanging Ina Mo (Last na 'To!) 
 Manuel V. Pangilinan — Rosario
 Vanessa R. Valdez — Miss You like Crazy
|-
! style="background:#EEDD82; width:50%" | Best Theme Song
! style="background:#EEDD82; width:50%" | Best Musical Score
|-
| valign="top" |
  "Miss You Like Crazy" — Miss You like Crazy (Erik Santos)
 "Sa 'Yo Lamang" — Sa 'yo Lamang (Juris Fernandez)
 "Lukso Ng Dugo" — Sigwa (Dessa Ilagan and Ayen Laurel)
 "Habambuhay"  — Ang Tanging Ina Mo (Last na 'To!) (Yeng Constantino)
 "Ang Buhay Nga Naman" — Noy (Noel Cabangon)
| valign="top" |
  Jessie Lasaten — Si Agimat at si Enteng Kabisote
 Francis Concio — Dalaw 
 Albert Chang — Rosario
 Carmina Cuya — Noy
 Lucien Letaba — Sigwa
|}

Special AwardsFAMAS Lifetime Achievement AwardNora AunorGerman Moreno Youth Achievement Award'''
Sam Concepcion 
Kathryn Bernardo
Sarah Lahbati
Alden Richards
Julia Montes
Louise delos Reyes

References

External links
FAMAS Awards 

FAMAS Award
FAM
FAM